The Sarkhej–Gandhinagar Highway, colloquially the S.G. Road or S.G. Highway, connects the city of Ahmedabad with Gandhinagar, the capital of the state of Gujarat, India. It forms the major part of NH 8C that connects Sarkhej with Chiloda near Gandhinagar. It is a major artery road for commercial and public transport and is witnessing a major construction boom along its route towards Gandhinagar.

History

The highway was primarily built as a mean to bypass the traffic from the City of Ahmedabad. But the lower land prices lead to a boom in the real estate and retail industry. Presently, the prices of land within the vicinity of the highway are more comparable to those in the downtown areas. It has emerged as a hub for educational, entertainment and corporate parks.

In the year 2015, the National Highways Authority of India transferred the administrative control of the highway to the Government of Gujarat.

Transportation
The highway is dotted with Ahmedabad Municipal Transport Service (AMTS) bus stops which connect the highway with the interior of the city. Also, AMTS has started a feeder air conditioning bus service in association with Airports Authority of India, connecting Sardar Vallabhbhai Patel International Airport with the city, having the last stop at Karnavati Club on Sarkhej–Gandhinagar Highway.

As per the estimation, a minimum of one lakh PCUs (Passenger Car Units) travels per day on this highway. And, during the festivals and on Mondays and Tuesdays, there is a sharp jump in the volume of traffic.

In the year 2015, Ahmedabad Municipal Corporation (AMC) started earmarking paid parking spots for various categories of vehicles on 4.7 km stretch between Karnavati Club and Hebatpur-Sola on the Highway, where a number of offices and shopping complexes are located.

Landmarks
The highway is dotted with large-scale retail outlets like Lifestyle, Globus, Croma, and Westside. Various automotive dealership showrooms including Porsche, BMW, Audi, Triumph, Jaguar, Land Rover, Range Rover, Nissan, Volvo, Toyota, Rolls-Royce, Harley-Davidson, Honda, Skoda, Jeep, Ducati and Mercedes are located on this road.

List of Important landmarks located on Sarkhej - Gandhinagar Highway:

Government Institutions
Gujarat High Court

Religious Institutions
Gobindham Gurudwara
ISKCON Temple
Vasihnodevi Temple

Educational Institutions & Research Centres
Consumer Education and Research Centre
Chimanbhai Patel Institute Of Management & Research
National Institute of Pharmaceutical Education and Research (NIPER) Ahmedabad Campus
Sola Bhagvat Vidhyapith
Nirma University
L. J. Campus

Hospitals
HCG Cancer Center
Sola Civil Hospital
Zydus Hospital

Corporate Institutions and Parks
GNFC Tower
Intas Biopharmaceuticals Corporate Office
Mondeal Square
Mondeal Heights
Shapath IV
Shapath V
Titanium One
Titanium Plaza
TTEC
Signature 1
Zydus Corporate Park (ZCP)

Entertainment Centres - Hotels, Clubs, and Malls
Acropolis Mall
Crowne Plaza Ahmedabad
ISCON Mall
Karnavati Club
Novotel Ahmedabad
Rajpath Club
The Grand Bhagwati
YMCA International Centre

Future Developments
On 7 July 2017, the Ministry of Road Transport and Highways has sanctioned INR 700 Crores for the development of 44 km stretch of the highway.

In popular culture
Mahesh Babu starrer 2013 Seethamma Vakitlo Sirimalle Chettu (Telugu Film) was shot near Cinemax Multiplex, within the vicinity of the highway.

Gallery

References

External links
Sarkhej Gandhinagar highway's video and detail on DeshGujarat.Com

Roads in Gujarat
Transport in Ahmedabad
Transport in Gandhinagar